Israel Chiriboga (born 1998) is an Ecuadorian artistic gymnast.

In 2017, he competed at the 2017 South American Artistic Gymnastics Championships held in Cochabamba, Bolivia.

In 2018, he won the silver medal in the men's horizontal bar event at the 2018 Pacific Rim Gymnastics Championships held in Medellín, Colombia.

References

External links 
 

Living people
1998 births
Place of birth missing (living people)
Ecuadorian male artistic gymnasts
21st-century Ecuadorian people